George Alexander Jupp (30 May 1927 – 23 November 2018) was a Canadian teacher, businessman and politician. Jupp was a Progressive Conservative party member of the House of Commons of Canada.

He represented Ontario's Mississauga North electoral district which he won in the 1979 federal election. After serving his only term, the 31st Canadian Parliament, he was defeated in the 1980 federal election by Douglas Fisher of the Liberal party. He died at Sunnybrook Health Sciences Centre in Toronto in November 2018 at the age of 91.

References

External links
 

1927 births
2018 deaths
Members of the House of Commons of Canada from Ontario
Progressive Conservative Party of Canada MPs
People from Arcola, Saskatchewan